Paul David Rigdon (born November 2, 1975) is a former American professional baseball player who was a pitcher for two Major League Baseball seasons.

Rigdon was born in Jacksonville, Florida.  He attended Trinity Christian Academy in Jacksonville, and the University of Florida in Gainesville, where he played for the Florida Gators baseball team in 1996.

See also 

 Florida Gators
 List of Florida Gators baseball players

External links 

1975 births
Living people
Akron Aeros players
Baseball players from Jacksonville, Florida
Buffalo Bisons (minor league) players
Cleveland Indians players
Florida Gators baseball players
Indianapolis Indians players
Kinston Indians players
Mahoning Valley Scrappers players
Major League Baseball pitchers
Milwaukee Brewers players
FSC Jacksonville Blue Wave baseball players